Daniel Ings (born 1985) is an actor from England. He starred as Luke Curran in the Channel 4/Netflix comedy series Lovesick.

Early life
Ings attended Dauntsey's School in Wiltshire, followed by Lancaster University where he studied theatre studies, graduating in 2008. Ings later trained at Bristol Old Vic Theatre School and the National Youth Theatre.

Career
Ings has appeared in a number of stage, short films and television programmes. His most notable role to date is that of the playboy best friend Luke in Netflix romantic comedy Lovesick. Also notable are the roles of Jake in the Channel 4 comedy Pete versus Life, Kelvin in the BBC comedy-drama Psychoville and John in Sky 1's comedy The Café in November 2011.

He has also appeared as the unscrupulous "Director of Output" Matt Taverner in the BBC2 mockumentary W1A (2014–2015) and as Commander Mike Parker in the Netflix series The Crown (2016–2017). In 2018, he began playing the husband of Alan Cumming's lead character on the CBS drama television series Instinct.

Most recently he appeared as Francis Marindin in Julian Fellowes' series The English Game for Netflix and as Cob, the embittered husband to Billie Piper's Suzie in acclaimed Sky Atlantic series I Hate Suzie.

Filmography

Film

Television

Stage
 The Master and Margarita (Lyric Hammersmith, 2004)
 White Boy (Soho Theatre, 2007)
 Tory Boyz (Soho Theatre, 2008)
 I See Myself As a Bit of an Indiana Jones Figure (Old Red Lion, 2010)
 Frankenstein (National Theatre, 2011) as Victor/Servant 1
 Howl's Moving Castle (Southwark Playhouse, 2011) as Howl
 One Man, Two Guvnors (Theatre Royal Haymarket, from 2 March 2012) as Alan Dangle

References

External links 
 
 Daniel Ings at the National Theatre Website

1985 births
Living people
Alumni of Bristol Old Vic Theatre School
Alumni of Lancaster University
English male film actors
English male stage actors
English male television actors
National Youth Theatre members
People educated at Dauntsey's School